Stellify Media is a Northern Irish television production company. Stellify was formed by Kieran Doherty and Matthew Worthy as a joint venture with Sony Pictures Television.

Stellify are best known for successfully rebooting the UK version of Who Wants to Be a Millionaire? with Jeremy Clarkson for ITV, and Blind Date with Paul O'Grady for Channel 5.

Background
On 20 March 2014, Doherty and Worthy launched the production company Stellify Media as a joint venture with Sony Pictures Television. Doherty and Worthy jointly develop and executive produce all of Stellify's content. Stellify are primarily based in Belfast and also have headquarters in London.

List of programs

Can't Touch This (2016)
Can't Touch This is a BBC One physical game show hosted by Zoë Ball and Ashley Banjo, with voice-over provided by Sue Perkins. If a contestant touches a prize they win the prize.

Goodbye House (2017-)
Goodbye House is a property show on RTÉ One in which siblings must compete to find the perfect 'downsized' home for their parents. The show piloted in 2017, with a full series airing in 2019.

Don't Say It... Bring It! (2017)
Don't Say It... Bring It! is a game show on Dave that involved contestants having to physically find the answers to questions and bring them back to host Jason Byrne in order to win money.

In Solitary: The Anti-Social Experiment (2017)
In Solitary: The Anti-Social Experiment is a Channel 5 entertainment format that tests whether or not three members of the public can withstand being in solitary confinement for up to 5 days. George Lamb hosts and also participates.

Space Truckers (2017)
Space Truckers is a BBC One Northern Ireland formatted-documentary about Ryan Milligan, an Ardglass trucker and astrophysicist, who is tasked with transporting a supercomputer for the LOFAR space telescope from The Netherlands to Ireland.

Blind Date (2017–2019)
A revival of the classic UK dating show that aired on Channel 5, hosted by Paul O'Grady and voiced over by Melanie Sykes. This was co-produced with So Television.

Blind Date Ireland (2017)
Stellify Media also produced an Irish version of the hit show, hosted by IFTA Award winning comedian Al Porter that aired on TV3 in 2017. This was co-produced with Al's company Pink Tie Productions.

Beauty Queen and Single (2017–)
Beauty Queen & Single is a dating format where 6 beauty queens go on a series of dates with no make-up to see if they can make a connection that is more than skin deep. The first series launched in 2017 on BBC One Northern Ireland and the second series launched in 2019 on BBC One Wales, with both series being made available UK-wide on BBC iPlayer after airing. A third series is launching in December 2022 on BBC Three

Who Wants to Be a Millionaire? (2018–)
To commemorate the 20th anniversary of the game show, a week of special episodes aired on ITV, with Jeremy Clarkson as host. The revival received mostly positive reviews from critics and fans, and, as well as high viewing figures, led to ITV renewing the show for further series with Clarkson returning as host.

A Taste of Home (2018)
A Taste of Home is a BBC One Northern Ireland cookery format in which exotic international dishes are prepared for local guests. This was co-produced with Afro-Mic Productions.

Gino's Win Your Wish List (2018–2021)
Gino's Win Your Wish List is a Channel 5 game show hosted by Gino D'Acampo, in which families answer questions to win prizes from their wish list.

Celebs in Solitary (2018)
Celebs in Solitary is a celebrity edition of In Solitary: The Anti-Social Experiment on Channel 5, in which Anthea Turner, Professor Green, Eddie Hall, and Shazia Mirza attempt to spend five days in solitary confinement. Presented by George Lamb.

Parents' Evening (2018–2019)
Parents' Evening is a BBC One Northern Ireland documentary series that goes inside the most important night of the high school calendar – the parent-teacher meeting.

Hot Right Now (2018)
Hot Right Now is a spinoff of Beauty Queen & Single. It is a BBC One Northern Ireland topical talk show, in which Vinny Hurrell is joined by Gemma Garrett, Orlaith McAllister, Rebecca Maguire and Ashleigh Coyle as they take to the road to explore the unique quirks of Northern Ireland. They then discuss how they get on back in studio as the team review their adventures in a way only they can.

Flinch (2019)
Flinch is a physical gameshow for Netflix. The show is hosted by Seann Walsh, Lloyd Griffith, and Desiree Burch.

There's No Place Like Tyrone (2019-)
There's No Place Like Tyrone is Northern Ireland's first ever constructed reality show. The show is based around farmers in County Tyrone.

Secret Body (2019-)
Secret Body is the "world's first undercover weight loss show". Hosted by Stephen Clarke and Rab Shields (known online as The Kilted Coaches), this show sees people undergo a body transformation over 12 weeks, while wearing a specially-designed 'fat suit' to hide their progress.

Pretty Single (2020)
Pretty Single is a spinoff of Beauty Queen & Single, featuring six beautiful and single women, ditching their glamorous hair and make-up.

Celebrity Snoop Dogs (2020)
Celebrity Snoop Dogs is a celebrity property show for Channel 4 where cameras go inside the locked-down houses of well-known faces around the UK, but the filming is done by the celebrity homeowners' pet dogs.

Who Wants To Be A Millionaire?: The Million Pound Question (2020)
Who Wants To Be A Millionaire?: The Million Pound Question is a six-part documentary series on ITV that revisits the iconic UK million pound winners from the world-famous game show - and looks at the best moments from the archives. It is narrated by Stephen Mangan. The sixth and final part of the series is entitled Who Wants To Be A Millionaire?: A Very Major Scandal.

Barbershop For Bald Men (2021)
Barbershop For Bald Men is a BBC One NI documentary that sees three young men share their stories about premature hair loss and undergo astonishing transformations.

Fast Food Face Off (2021)
Fast Food Face Off is a BBC Three/BBC NI food show in which stand-up comedian Josh Jones pits Kristian Nairn and Gemma Bradley against each other in a competition to find the best takeaway in town.

Farm To Feast: Best Menu Wins (2021-)
Farm To Feast: Best Menu Wins is a BBC NI cooking competition show hosted by Eamonn Holmes, in which seven of Northern Ireland's most talented amateur cooks compete against each other using the best of ingredients on their doorstep, to make culinary masterpieces.

Fastest Finger First (2022)
Fastest Finger First is a Spinoff to the original UK edition of Who Wants To Be A Millionaire hosted by Anita Rani, in which contestants battle it out for the one prize money can't buy - a guaranteed place on the world's biggest quiz show, and the opportunity to win a million pounds.

Non-television Productions
Spot The Glitch - a mobile game published to the Facebook Gaming platform in November 2018. Players must search a manipulated photo and identify what has been altered.
NI Hospice: Lights To Remember - an annual production starting from 2020, commemorating loved ones that passed away while in pallative care at Northern Ireland Hospice. Hosted on the NI Hospice YouTube channel.
Virtually Impossible - an upcoming virtual reality game show presented by Joe Sugg, set to launch on his YouTube channel. Contestants must navigate an obstacle course in real-life while wearing a VR headset. The VR course is the same in structure as its real-life counterpart, but it features enhanced graphics to make the challenge more difficult.
Get In The Van - an upcoming game show for Channel 4.0 presented by Spuddz and America Foster. Teams compete to find three extraordinary strangers from the tallest person to the person with the most tattoos, to avoid a humiliating forfeit. Co-production with Acclaimed Content. Launching on 10 December 2022.

References

External links

Stellify Media at Sony Pictures Television

Sony Pictures Entertainment
Sony Pictures Television
Sony Pictures Television production companies
Television production companies of the United Kingdom
2014 establishments in Northern Ireland
British companies established in 2014
Mass media companies established in 2014
Companies based in Belfast
Joint ventures